Gunsight Peak is in Wenatchee National Forest in the U.S. state of Washington. On the east slopes of Gunsight Peak lies Blue Glacier while to the west lies the larger Chickamin Glacier. The tallest of a series of peaks along Blue Mountain, Gunsight Peak is a challenging climb and ropes are recommended.

References

Mountains of Washington (state)
Mountains of Chelan County, Washington